The following is a list of seasons completed by the VMI Keydets football team. Representing the Virginia Military Institute, the Keydets compete in the Southern Conference of the NCAA Division I. VMI competed in the SoCon for 79 years from 1924 to 2002, and moved to the Big South in 2003, but returned to the SoCon beginning in the 2014–2015 academic year. The Keydets have played their home games out of 10,000-seat Alumni Memorial Field since 1962. The Keydets will be led beginning in 2023 by head coach Danny Rocco.

Though VMI played their first intercollegiate football game in 1873 against Washington and Lee University, the first official team was fielded in 1891 under coach Walter H. Taylor III. The program was successful early on, notching two undefeated seasons in 1894 and 1899, and another 9–0 campaign in 1920. VMI captured their first of seven conference titles in 1951 under head coach Tom Nugent with a 5–0 mark in SoCon play and a 7–3 record overall. The Keydets won 4 additional Southern Conference championships in a six-year span between 1957 and 1962 under the direction of John McKenna, who, to this day, is the all-time coaching wins leader at the Institute.

After playing as an independent, VMI joined the South Atlantic Intercollegiate Athletic Association in 1918. Following the league's disbandment in 1921, VMI joined the Southern Conference in 1924 where they would remain for 79 seasons until joining the Big South Conference in 2003. The Keydets will return to their roots in 2014, as it was announced they would rejoin the SoCon in May 2013.

VMI earned their first trip to the FCS playoffs since the subdivision's inception in 1978, as a result of being the 2020 Southern Conference Football Champions, accomplishing their first winning season since 1981.

Seasons

Notes

References

Other References
 2020 VMI Football Record Book
 Southern Conference Index

Vmi
VMI Keydets football seasons